Stromatoolithus is an oogenus of dinosaur egg. The oogenus contains one oospecies, S. pinglingensis.

See also 
 List of dinosaur oogenera

References

Bibliography 
 Carpenter, K. 1999. Eggs, Nests, and Baby Dinosaurs: A Look at Dinosaur Reproduction (Life of the Past). Indiana University Press, Bloomington, Indiana
 Z. Zhao, J. Ye, H. Li, Z. Zhao, and Z. Yan. 1991. Extinction of the dinosaurs across the Cretaceous-Tertiary boundary in Nanxiong Basin, Guangdong Province. Vertebrata PalAsiatica 29(1):1-20

Dinosaur reproduction
Fossil parataxa described in 1991